SCID is a four-letter acronym that may refer to:

 Severe combined immunodeficiency
 Severe combined immunodeficiency (non-human)
 Shane's Chess Information Database
 Source Code in Database
 Structured Clinical Interview for DSM